Anna Margaretha Spoerri Renfer (1896-1984) was a Swiss composer who wrote music for cello, piano, and voice.

Renfer was born in Biel/Bienne. She studied piano as a child, then attended the Bern Conservatory, the University of Bern, the Conservatory of Bienne, and studied privately in Gstaad. Her teachers included Adrian Aeschbacher, Edwin Fischer, Ernst Levy, Josef Pembauer, Hermann Scherchen, and Rudolf Serkin.

Renfer's music was published by Hug (today Gebrüder Hug & Co.) Her compositions included:

Chamber 

Sonata in c minor (cello and piano)

Piano 

Studies for the Left Hand

Vocal 

44 Songs
“Bridal song for High Voice”
Eight Songs for Soprano
Sacred Chants (a cappella and for chorus; text by Josef Reinhart)

References 

Swiss women composers
1896 births
1984 deaths
University of Bern alumni